"Ain't Afraid to Die" is a single released by Dir En Grey on April 18, 2001. It appears on Decade 1998–2002 but is not featured on any of their studio albums. Both B-sides are included on the Kai remix compilation.

Track listing

Note 
A re-recording of "Ain't Afraid to Die" appears on the second disc of the Limited and Deluxe Editions of their 2022 album Phalaris.

Chart position

Personnel
Dir En Grey – producer
Kyo - vocals
Kaoru – guitar
Die – guitar
Toshiya – bass guitar
Shinya – drums
Toru Yamazaki – producer
Gen Ittetsu Strings – orchestra
MC Kids – choir
Koji Yoda – art director

References

2001 singles
Dir En Grey songs
Songs written by Kyo (musician)
2001 songs
Sony Music Entertainment Japan singles